

The IAR-822 was an agricultural aircraft built in Romania in the 1960s. Based on the IAR-821, it was a conventional low-wing monoplane with fixed, tailwheel undercarriage and differed from its predecessor mainly in the choice of a horizontally opposed engine in place of a radial.

Development
The IAR-822 is an agricultural crop sprayer and duster. It is the direct descendant of the IAR-821, from which it retains the fuselage. The design was completed under the leadership of Radu Manicatide in 1970, at IMFCA Bucharest (Institutul de Mecanica Fluidelor si Cercetari Aerospatiale - Institute of Fluid Mechanics and Aerospace Research).

A low-wing monoplane, it featured mixed wood-metal structure, with the fuselage and wing roots constructed from welded chrome-molybdenum tubing, with the outer wings and tail unit made from wood. The front fuselage had aluminium skin, while the rest of the surface was plywood covered with fabric.

The need for a trainer was addressed with the creation of the IAR-822B, which first flew on 12 November 1973 at Bucharest with Constantin Manolache at the controls. The chemical tank was replaced by the student pilot's seat, the instructor being in the rear (original) cockpit. The fuselage was entirely covered in aluminium and the controls and trimmer were electrically actuated. It served as a civilian trainer for the IAR 822 A and IAR 826 but also as a military trainer, being operated by the Air Force school at Boboc.

Operational history
The prototype (registered YR-MCA) first flew on 20 March 1970, piloted by Constantin "Titi" Manolache, a renowned Romanian aerobatics and civilian test pilot. It was built at IRMA (Intreprinderea de Reparatii Material Aeronautic - Enterprise for Aeronautical Material Repairement), in Bucharest. The spraying/dusting equipment was certified during a flight on 10 August 1970. The first serial plane, YR-MCB, first flew on 14 June 1971.

The fourth built plane, was displayed at the General Aviation Salon at Cannes, France 24–25 May 1972, together with the Romanian made IS-28 glider and IS-24 light plane. It was also presented at the General Aviation Show at Hannover, the same year. However, no exports orders were received and the aircraft enjoyed little success even at home, mainly due to being underpowered.

IAR 822A was in use until the early 1980s, with an average of 400 flight hours/year/airframe. They were predominantly employed in the agricultural role, but were sometimes used for aerial surveillance of pipe lines and power lines.

At least five IAR-822 Bs were used by the Romanian Air Force for a brief period in 1974-75, probably to complement the tired IAR-813 in the primary training role until the IAR-823 entered service in sufficient numbers. The sole survivor is serial number 05, which can be seen (without tail unit and outer wings) at the Muzeul Aviatiei, Bucharest.

Twenty examples of the IAR-822A were produced by IRMA Bucharest in 1970-71. There were ten IAR-822Bs built by IRMA Bucharest in 1973-74.

Variants
IAR-822A
Basic version agricultural crop sprayer and duster
IAR-822B
Tandem two-seat trainer, 10 examples built by IRMA Bucharest in 1973-74.

Operators

Romanian Utilitary Aviation - the only operator of the IAR-822A 
Romanian Air Force - used at least 5 IAR-822B for a brief period

Specifications (IAR-822 - with agricultural equipment)

See also

External links 
 IAR822 at airwar.ru
 IAR 822 pdf brochure

References

 
  
 
 

1960s Romanian agricultural aircraft
822
Aircraft first flown in 1970
Low-wing aircraft
Single-engined tractor aircraft